Aleksandr Yuryevich Shubladze (born 21 March 1985) is a Russian former professional football player.

Club career
He played 3 seasons in the Russian Football National League for FC Lisma-Mordovia Saransk and FC Baltika Kaliningrad.

External links
 
 

1985 births
People from Samtredia
Living people
Russian footballers
Association football midfielders
FC Volgar Astrakhan players
FC Dynamo Stavropol players
FC Mordovia Saransk players
FC Zenit-2 Saint Petersburg players
FC Spartak Kostroma players
FC Belshina Bobruisk players
FC Dnepr Mogilev players
FC Baltika Kaliningrad players
Belarusian Premier League players
Russian expatriate footballers
Expatriate footballers in Belarus
FC Chayka Peschanokopskoye players
FC Mashuk-KMV Pyatigorsk players